A. W. Blair was an American politician. He was a member of the California State Assembly for Monterey, California from 1861 to 1862. In 1861, he voted against a state resolution for California to stay in the Union (which passed the assembly).

References

People from Monterey, California
Members of the California State Assembly
19th-century American politicians
People in 19th-century California